List of all Clube Atlético Mineiro transfers in the 2011 season.

Players in / out

Transfers in 

Total spending:  €2.1 million.

Transfers out 

Total income:  €6.5 million.

Expenditure:  €4.4 million.

References

Players